The 2011 FIS Nordic Junior World Ski Championships were held in Otepää, Estonia from 26 January to 31 January 2011. It was the 34th Junior World Championships and the 6th Under-23 World Championships in nordic skiing.

Medal summary

Junior events

Cross-country skiing

Notes
Ladies' junior 5 km freestyle: The Norwegians were sovereign in the race, conquering the top four places.
Men's junior 10 km freestyle: Norway continued it superb performances with Skar taking the victory by over 15 seconds. Finland's Perttu Hyvärinen did a great job on the last lap by rising from 6th to 3rd place and grabbing the medal.

Nordic combined

Ski jumping

Under-23 events

Cross-country skiing

Notes
Ladies under-23 10 km freestyle: In extremely cold weather at -20 degrees Celsius, Krista Lähteenmäki, 20, lead from start to finish to take gold by a crushing 1- minute deficit to the second placed Maria Guschina. Although only 20 years old the finn had already placed 8th in the 2010–11 Tour de Ski. The defending champion Kerttu Niskanen, also a finn, lost over  minutes to her teammate, placing 9th. Norway took already their 5th medal in the games, with Hilde Lauvhaug finishing 3rd.

Medal table

References

External links 

 Cross country results
 Ski jumping results
 Nordic combined results

FIS Nordic Junior World Ski Championships
Otepää Parish
International sports competitions hosted by Estonia
2011 in cross-country skiing
2011 in Nordic combined
2011 in ski jumping
2011 in Estonian sport
2011 in youth sport
Skiing in Estonia